= Choshi River =

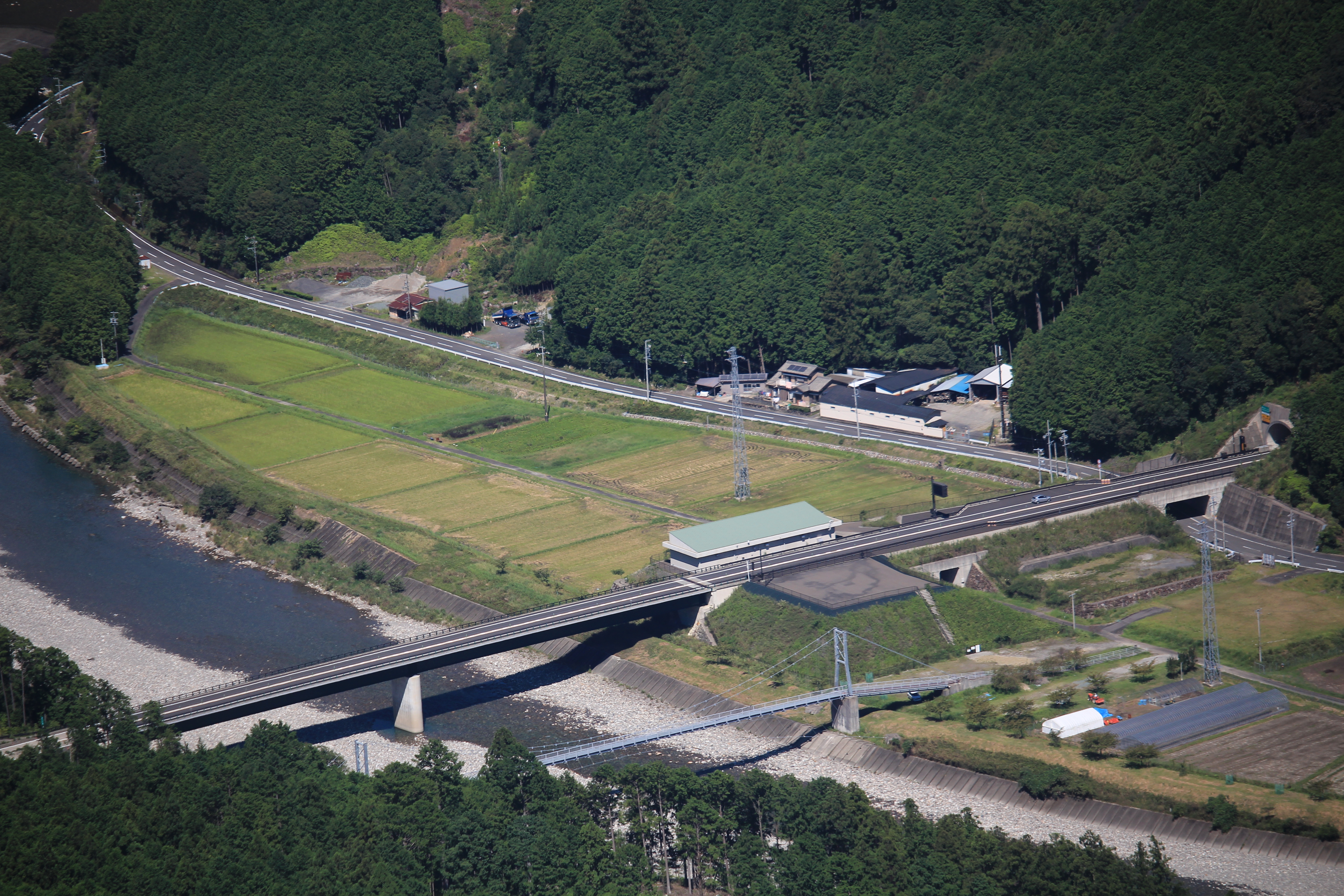
- Choshi viewed from Mount Tengura

- Location within Japan
- Native name: 銚子川 (Japanese)

Location
- Country: Japan
- Prefecture: Mie

Physical characteristics
- Source
  - elevation: 1,600 m (5,200 ft)
- Mouth
  - coordinates: 34°06′14″N 136°13′55.1″E
- Length: 17 km (11 mi)

The Choshi River (銚子川 Choshi-gawa) is a minor river that flows through Mie Prefecture on the island of Honshū, Japan. It is officially classified as a Class 2 river by the Japanese government. It is one of clearest rivers of Japan with visibility to three meters depth. River water quality is so good that it was ranked first in 2007 and 2011 in Mie Prefecture. It is also called miracle of nature.

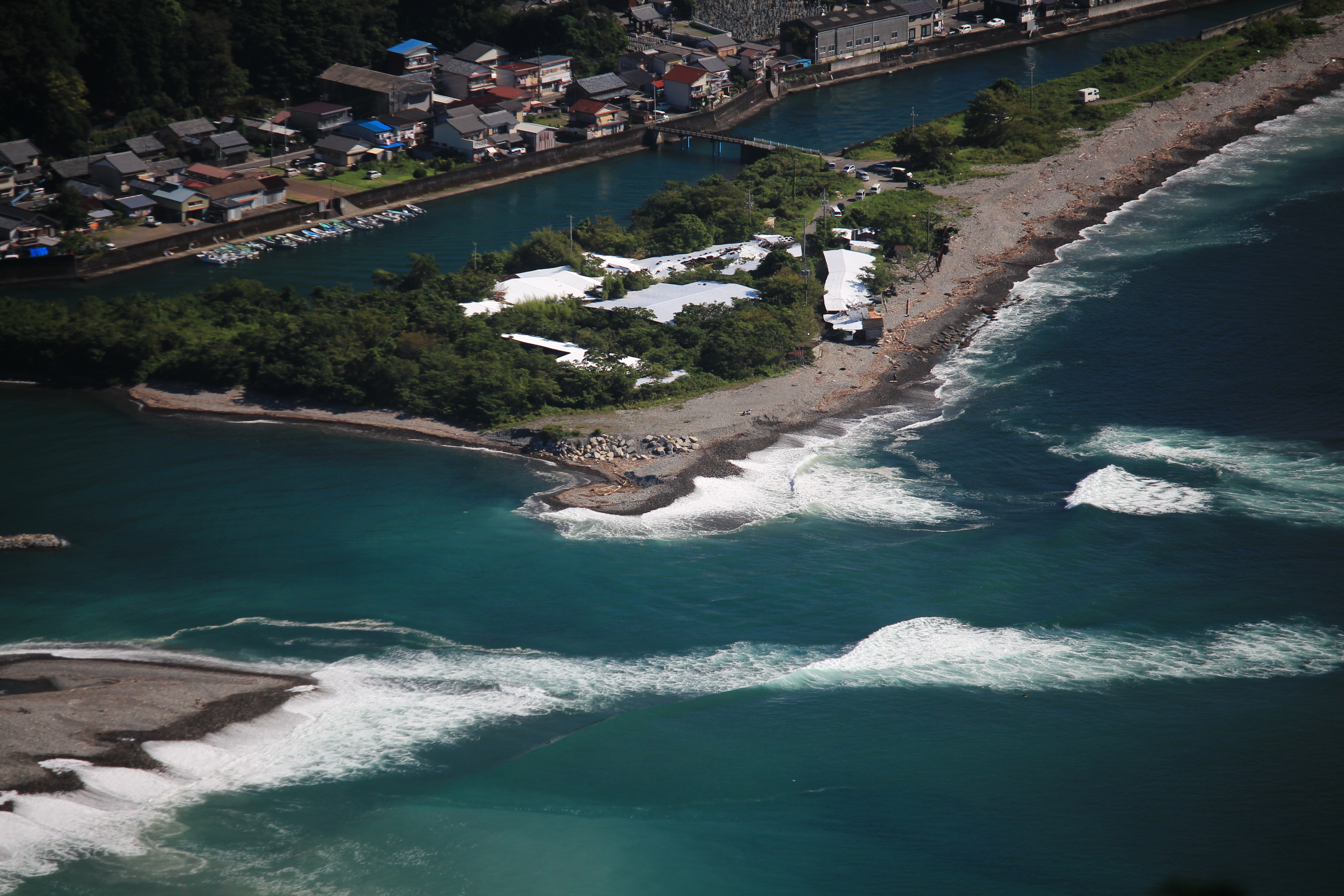
Choshi River mouth aerial view
